The Alsatian Grand Cru vineyard Schoenenbourg is situated north of the village Riquewihr. The vineyard faces south and south-east on the steep hill Schoenenbourg. The altitude of the vines are between 265 and 380 meters and covers 53.4 ha og Keuper subsoil with marl, gypsum and dolomite.

History 
Viticulture at Schoenenbourg goes back hundreds of years. The philosopher Voltaire owned vineyards at the site and the wine from Schoenenbourg was admired throughout northern Europe.

While the Grand Cru designation was being developed in the 1970s, Schoenenbourg was not to wear those laurels until a decree in 1992.

Varietals 
Schoenenbourg is planted mainly with Riesling, Muscat and Pinot gris

Wine Styles 
Schoenenbourg is home to both dry wines, late harvested "Vendanges Tardives" and the noble sweet wines called Selection de Grains Nobles

Producers 
Hugel & Fils
Marcel Deiss
Dopff au Moulin
Dopff & Irion
Domaine Charles Sparr
Domaine Bott Geyl
Domaine Agapé

References

Alsace wine AOCs